Dieudonné Disi (born 24 November 1980 in Ntyazo, Butare) is a Rwandan long-distance and cross country runner.

In 2009 he competed in the marathon at the 2009 World Championships in Athletics, but pulled out at the 28 km mark due to an injury. He rebounded after this with a series of victories in October, winning the 10,000 metres race at the Jeux de la Francophonie, the 20 Kilometres de Paris two weeks later, then equalling the course record at the Reims Half Marathon.

Competition record

Personal bests
3000 metres – 7:50.81 min (2008)
5000 metres – 13:25.13 min (2008)
10,000 metres – 27:22 min (2007)
Half marathon – 59:32 min (2007)

References

External links

Focus on Athletes – Dieudonne Disi from IAAF

1980 births
Living people
Rwandan male long-distance runners
Olympic athletes of Rwanda
Athletes (track and field) at the 2008 Summer Olympics
Athletes (track and field) at the 2010 Commonwealth Games
Athletes (track and field) at the 2014 Commonwealth Games
Commonwealth Games competitors for Rwanda
People from Nyanza District
Athletes (track and field) at the 1999 All-Africa Games
Athletes (track and field) at the 2003 All-Africa Games
African Games competitors for Rwanda